The Chief of Staff to the Prime Minister  is the top official in Canada's Prime Minister's Office (PMO). The position was created in 1987 to head the PMO.

Prior to the creation of the chief of staff position, the office was headed by the prime minister's principal secretary, a position that is now secondary to the chief of staff. Individuals who held the position of principal secretary prior to 1987 were essentially de facto chiefs of staff, and may sometimes be informally referred to as chiefs of staff in some sources, but did not hold the formal title chief of staff.

Bernard Roy, Brian Mulroney's principal secretary from 1984 to 1988, was the last principal secretary to act as head of the PMO before the creation of the chief of staff position.

List of Chiefs of Staff

References